El País is a regional daily newspaper based in Cali, Colombia, and leading newspaper of the Colombian Pacific Region. El País is a member of the Latin American Newspaper Association.

References

Publications established in 1950
Newspapers published in Colombia
Spanish-language newspapers
Mass media in Cali